Barbara Stevens (born September 20, 1954) is the former head coach of the Bentley University women's basketball team. Stevens had previously served as head basketball coach for Clark University and Massachusetts. Stevens was inducted into the Women's Basketball Hall of Fame in 2006. She was elected to the Naismith Memorial Basketball Hall of Fame in 2020.

In January 2018, Stevens became the fifth women's basketball coach to reach the 1,000 win milestone. Bentley defeated Adelphi University 78–66. Bentley had lost to Adelphi in their last four meetings.

High school
Stevens attended two high schools, Marianhill Central Catholic High School in Southbridge, Massachusetts, then Saint Peter-Marian High School in Worcester, Massachusetts. She played sports, but noted in an article about the history of Title IX, at the time "it was almost embarrassing sometimes to be known as a female athlete".

College
Stevens attended college at Bridgewater State College in Bridgewater, Massachusetts, graduating in 1976. She played on the school basketball team as a point guard, and was named captain. She noted about the experience, "Those of us who were interested in sports did play, but in front of very few people and with very little fanfare and very little notice. How we practiced, the amount of time and what we did to get ready for season are just so different now." In addition to basketball, she also played on the softball team for two years and on the tennis team for two years where she was also named captain.

Coaching career
Stevens started her coaching career as an assistant coach at Clark University in 1976. The school was not known as a solid basketball team but she helped the team win the Massachusetts Association of Intercollegiate Athletics for Women (MAIAW) Division III State Championship. The team record was 14–5. Stevens was named as head coach the following year. She remained the head coach at Clark for six seasons with three MAIAW titles and five postseason appearances. Twice, the team reached the NCAA Division III Final Four. In her final year at Clark she was named the WBCA coach of the year for district 1.

She took over the head coaching duties at Massachusetts in 1983, inheriting a team that had a record of 5-22 in the prior year. Under Stevens leadership, the team improved to 10–17, but they were unable to reach the .500 mark. Despite the modest record, her skills as a coach were recognized. In her final year at Massachusetts, her team played Connecticut, which at the time was not a recognized basketball power. They were coached by Geno Auriemma, who would go on to be named to the Women's Basketball Hall of Fame, the Basketball Hall of Fame, and twice named as the Olympic coach, but at the time he was in his first year as a coach. It was his seventh game as a coach. He noted that Massachusetts had beaten UConn the previous year and they were leading by substantial margin in this game. Then he noticed "something clicked" and the players began applying what they had learned in practice. UConn ended up winning the game 62–59; Auriemma rates it as one of his favorite memories and said of UMass, "they are a good team, well coached by Barbara Stevens. She's great."

Stevens came to Bentley in 1986. Her first year was a good year as the team achieved a record of 24–5. In her second year the team won 28 games. In 1988, her teams started a five-year string of 30 or more victories each year.

In 2014, the team went undefeated with a 35–0 record. Bentley reached the national championship game against West Texas A&M. With under six minutes remaining, the team was losing by nine points. One of the players asked the coach if they could go into their full-court pressure defense. Three of the players had four fouls, making such a tactic dangerous but they implemented the press and it was effective. Late in the game, Lauren Battista scored a three-pointer to put the Falcons ahead, then stole the inbounds pass and scored to give Bentley a 65–61 lead to put them ahead for good. The win gave Stevens her first national championship.

Stevens Court 
In March 2018, Bentley University made the decision to name the basketball court in the Dana Athletic Center after Stevens. At the naming ceremony, the president of the University, Gloria Cordes Larson said, "Coach Stevens has arguably become one of the top five coaches in the history of all women’s basketball -- and certainly the best ever in NCAA Division II. It’s hard to imagine that anyone will ever come close to replicating the success she and her program have achieved."

Head coaching record
Source

Awards and honors
 1992 WBCA National Coach of the Year (Division II)
 1999 WBCA National Coach of the Year (Division II)
 2001 WBCA National Coach of the Year (Division II)
 2002 Carol Eckman Award
 2002 New England Basketball Hall of Fame
 2006 Women's Basketball Hall of Fame
 2006 Clark University Hall of Fame
 2013 WBCA National Coach of the Year (Division II)
 2014 WBCA National Coach of the Year (Division II)

Notes

References

External links
 Official bio

1954 births
Living people
American women's basketball coaches
Basketball coaches from Massachusetts
Bentley University faculty
Bridgewater State Bears athletes
College women's basketball players in the United States
Naismith Memorial Basketball Hall of Fame inductees
People from Southbridge, Massachusetts
UMass Minutewomen basketball coaches
Sportspeople from Worcester County, Massachusetts
American women academics
Bentley Falcons women's basketball coaches
Clark University people